The 2022 CS Golden Spin of Zagreb was held on December 7–10, 2022 in Sisak, Croatia. It was part of the 2022–23 ISU Challenger Series. Medals were awarded in the disciplines of men's singles, women's singles, pairs, and ice dance.

The non-Challenger portion of the event for juniors was cancelled.

Entries 
The International Skating Union published the list of entries on November 17, 2022.

Changes to preliminary assignments

Results

Men

Women

Pairs

Ice dance

References 

2022 in figure skating
CS
CS